Maycon Rogério Silva Calijuri (born 6 June 1986) is a Brazilian former professional footballer.

Career

Club
Maycon Calijuri was Topscorer for the Belorussian club FC Gomel in the 2009 season with 15 goals. He moved to Jagiellonia Białystok on a four-year contract deal in January 2010. In the summer 2010, he was loaned to Piast Gliwice. He returned to Jagiellonia one year later.
Maycon Calijuri was loaned to BATE Borisov prior to the start of the 2012 Belarusian Premier League season. He made just two league appearances for the club (and was not registered for the group stages of the Champions League) before the loan expired.

Honours

Club
Cambodian League:Winner(2017) with Boeung Ket FC.
 Polish Cup: Winner (2010) with Jagiellonia Białystok.
 Belarusian Premier League: Winner (2012) with FC BATE Borisov.

Individual
 Belarusian Premier League: top scorer (2009) with FC Gomel.

References

External links
 
 

1986 births
Living people
People from Jaboticabal
Brazilian footballers
Association football midfielders
Brazilian expatriate footballers
Expatriate footballers in Belarus
Expatriate footballers in Poland
Expatriate footballers in the United Arab Emirates
Expatriate footballers in Thailand
Expatriate footballers in Indonesia
Expatriate footballers in Cambodia
Brazilian expatriate sportspeople in Belarus
Brazilian expatriate sportspeople in Poland
União Recreativa dos Trabalhadores players
FC Gomel players
Jagiellonia Białystok players
Piast Gliwice players
FC BATE Borisov players
Masafi Club players
Associação Atlética Internacional (Limeira) players
Maycon Calijuri
Maycon Calijuri
Persiba Balikpapan players
Boeung Ket Rubber Field players
UAE First Division League players
Brazilian expatriate sportspeople in Cambodia
UiTM FC players
Shan United F.C. players
Expatriate footballers in Malaysia
Expatriate footballers in Myanmar
Footballers from São Paulo (state)